The 2021 Summit League women's soccer tournament was the postseason women's soccer tournament for the Summit League held on November 4 and 6, 2021. The three-match tournament took place at University of Denver Soccer Stadium in Denver, Colorado. The four-team single-elimination tournament consisted of two rounds based on seeding from regular season conference play. The Denver Pioneers were the defending champions, and were unable to defend their title losing to South Dakota State in the final.  The tournament win was South Dakota State's sixth as a member of the conference, and the second for coach Brock Thompson.  South Dakota State has now won two of the past three Summit League tournaments. As tournament champions, South Dakota State earned the Summit League's automatic berth into the 2021 NCAA Division I Women's Soccer Tournament.

Seeding 

The top four of the ten teams competing during the regular season qualified for the 2021 Tournament.  Seeding was based on regular season conference records.  No tiebreakers were required as the top four teams each finished with unique conference records.

Bracket

Source:

Schedule

Semifinals

Final

Statistics

Goalscorers

All-Tournament team

Source:

MVP in bold

References 

Summit League Women's Soccer Tournament
2021 Summit League women's soccer season